Erick Dowson Prado Meléndez (born January 25, 1976) is a retired Salvadoran professional footballer, and the current manager of first division team  Chalatenango.

Club career

ADET
A tall and tough defensive midfielder, Prado has had a lengthy career in the Primera División de Fútbol de El Salvador, starting with ADET, with whom he clinched promotion to the top tier, alongside Santos Rivera and Héctor Canjura.

After short spells at Alianza, ADET again, FAS and Atlético Marte, he ended up at Isidro Metapán for whom he played for almost 10 successive years bar a short stint at Segunda División club FESA.

Isidro Metapán
Skipper of Isidro Metapán, Prado suffered a serious knee injury at the end of the Apertura 2010 tournament and after almost 500 matches in 17 years of professional football, Prado finished his playing career in 2011, to become a coach.

With Isidro Metapán, Dowson Prado won the Clausura 2007, Apertura 2008, Clausura 2009, Clausura 2010 and Apertura 2010.

Coaching career

Turín FESA
In 2013 Dowson Prado signed as coach of Turín FESA. With Turín FESA Dowson Prado won the Clausura 2012 and Apertura 2014 of the Tercera División.

FAS reserves
In 2015 he signed as new coach of FAS reserves. With the juvenile team Dowson Prado won the Apertura 2015 tournament de Categoría de Reservas.

El Salvador Under-17
In January 2016 Dowson Prado signed as new coach of El Salvador (Under 17), replacing Edgar Henríquez. In May 2017, Dowson Prado was not renewed by the FESFUT.

FAS
Dowson Prado signed as new coach of FAS for the rest of the Apertura 2018 tournament, replacing Colombian manager Álvaro de Jesús Gómez, who left the team because of family problems. Previously, Dowson Prado worked as an assistant of Álvaro de Jesús Gómez. In November 25, Dowson Prado got to classify FAS for the quarter-finals of the Apertura 2018 tournament, after a 0–0 draw against Isidro Metapán in the Estadio Jorge Calero Suárez.

International career
Prado made his debut for El Salvador in a December 1993 friendly match against the United States and has earned a total of 20 caps, scoring no goals.

He has represented his country in 7 FIFA World Cup qualification matches and played at the 1999 and 2005 UNCAF Nations Cups as well as at the 1996 CONCACAF Gold Cup.

His final international game was a February 2005 UNCAF Nations Cup match against Costa Rica.

Honours
Primera División de Fútbol de El Salvador: 5
 Clausura 2007, Apertura 2088, Clausura 2009, Clausura 2010, Apertura 2010

References

External links

1976 births
Living people
Sportspeople from San Salvador
Salvadoran footballers
El Salvador international footballers
1996 CONCACAF Gold Cup players
2005 UNCAF Nations Cup players
Alianza F.C. footballers
C.D. FAS footballers
C.D. Atlético Marte footballers
A.D. Isidro Metapán footballers
Association football midfielders